Elijah James Crane (born January 3, 1980) is an American politician and businessman elected as the U.S. representative from Arizona's 2nd congressional district since 2023. A member of the Republican Party, Crane served in the United States Navy SEALs and co-founded Bottle Breacher, a company that manufactures bottle openers made of 50-caliber shell casings. In the 2022 election, Crane defeated incumbent Democrat Tom O'Halleran.

Early life and education 
Crane was born in Tucson, Arizona, and raised in Yuma. His father worked as a pharmacist. Crane graduated from Cibola High School in 1998 and studied sociology at Arizona Western College and the University of Arizona. One week after the September 11 attacks, he dropped out of college and enlisted in the United States Navy.

Career 
Crane served in the U.S. Navy from 2001 to 2014. He graduated from Basic Underwater Demolition/SEAL training BUD/S class 256. After SEAL Qualification Training (SQT), he received the NEC 5326 as a Combatant Swimmer (SEAL), entitled to wear the Special Warfare Insignia. During his career, he was a member of the United States Navy SEALs and was deployed five times. After leaving the military, Crane co-founded Bottle Breacher, a company that manufactures bottle openers made of 50-caliber shell casings. He and his wife pitched the product on an episode of Shark Tank and received investments from Kevin O'Leary and Mark Cuban.

U.S. House of Representatives

2022 election 

During his 2022 campaign for Arizona's 2nd congressional district, Crane was endorsed by Donald Trump. Crane additionally accepted the endorsement of far-right state senator Wendy Rogers before the date of the primary election. Crane won the August Republican primary, defeating state representative Walter Blackman and others. Crane promoted the false conspiracy theory that there were "massive amounts of fraud" in the 2020 United States Presidential Election. Crane called upon the Arizona State Legislature to decertify Joe Biden's victory in the state, and for the Attorney General of Arizona to launch a criminal investigation into alleged voter fraud.

Tenure 
Crane did not support Kevin McCarthy for House Speaker, and was one of six Republicans to vote against him on every ballot in the 2023 election. In the 15th and final round of voting, Crane dropped his support for a different candidate and voted "present".

Syria 
In 2023, Crane was among 47 Republicans to vote in favor of H.Con.Res. 21, which directed President Joe Biden to remove U.S. troops from Syria within 180 days.

Caucus memberships 

 Freedom Caucus

Personal Life 
Crane is Protestant.

Electoral history

References

External links 

 Representative Eli Crane official U.S. House website
 Eli Crane for Congress campaign website
 

|-

1980 births
American Protestants
Arizona Republicans
Christians from Arizona
Living people
Protestants from Arizona
Republican Party members of the United States House of Representatives from Arizona
United States Navy SEALs personnel
University of Arizona alumni